Peter Lewis is a British dog trainer known for popularizing dog agility competitions. Lewis began his dog career in 1962, working on pet dog training before widening his scope to working dogs and obedience training. In the 1980s Lewis pioneered a number of methods in acclimating dogs to holding a course though the use of hoops and poles.

Notable works

References

Dog trainers
Dog sports
Year of birth missing